Knema plumulosa is a species of plant in the family Myristicaceae. It is endemic to Peninsular Malaysia. It is threatened by habitat loss.

References

plumulosa
Endemic flora of Peninsular Malaysia
Vulnerable plants
Taxonomy articles created by Polbot
Taxa named by James Sinclair (botanist)